Ben C. Larkin (May 13, 1873 – November 22, 1949) was a North Dakota Republican Party politician who served as a North Dakota Public Service Commissioner from 1941 to his death in 1949. Prior to 1941, his title was North Dakota Railroad Commissioner. He had served in that position since 1928.

Biography
Ben Larkin was born in Wisconsin in 1873. He came to North Dakota in 1891, and worked on farms while he attended school. He graduated from the Commercial Department at Fargo College, and then managed a lumber yard for eight years. He farmed in Eddy County for 20 years, and served in the North Dakota House of Representatives from 1919 to 1926, and served as the Speaker of the House in 1925. He was appointed as the Chief Elevator Accountant for the North Dakota Railroad Commission in 1925, and served in that capacity until 1928. He then was appointed by Governor Arthur G. Sorlie to the Railroad Commission in 1928 after the resignation of Frank Milhollan. The Railroad Commission became known as the North Dakota Public Service Commission in 1940, and Larkin died in office on November 22, 1949 at the age of 76.

Notes

North Dakota Public Service Commissioners
1873 births
1949 deaths
Speakers of the North Dakota House of Representatives
Republican Party members of the North Dakota House of Representatives